The 1980–81 Scottish League Cup was the thirty-fifth season of Scotland's second football knockout competition. The competition was won by Dundee United for a second successive season, who defeated Dundee in the Final.

First round

First Leg

Second Leg

Second round

First Leg

Second Leg

Third round

First Leg

Second Leg

Quarter-finals

First Leg

Second Leg

Semi-finals

First Leg

Second Leg

Final

References

General

Specific

Scottish League Cup
Scottish League Cup seasons